William Barker (born 21 March 1981) is a British former professional tennis player.

Barker played collegiate tennis for Rice University in the United States, forming a doubles partnership with twin brother Richard. The pair had 35 consecutive wins in their junior year, culminating in a semifinal loss at the NCAA Division I Championships.

On the professional tour, Barker had a best doubles ranking of 244 in the world and partnered his brother in the main draw of the 2005 Wimbledon Championships, where the wildcard pairing were defeated in the first round by top seeds Jonas Björkman and Max Mirnyi.

References

External links
 
 

1981 births
Living people
British male tennis players
English male tennis players
Rice Owls men's tennis players
Twin sportspeople
English twins
Tennis people from the West Midlands (county)
Sportspeople from Solihull